Pontiggia is an Italian surname. Notable people with the surname include:

Giuseppe Pontiggia (1934–2003), Italian writer and literary critic
Simone Pontiggia (born 1993), Italian footballer

Italian-language surnames